Richard or Dick Sheppard may refer to:
 Dick Sheppard (priest) (1880–1937), English clergyman and pacifist
 Richard Sheppard (architect) (1910–1982), English architect
 Dick Sheppard (footballer) (1945–1998), English footballer
 Dick Sheppard or Richard Blade (born 1952), British-American radio and television personality

See also
 Dick Sheppard School, former girls school in Tulse Hill, South London
Richard Shepard (born 1965), American film director and screenwriter
Richard Shepherd (disambiguation)